Narges Mohammadi (born 21 April 1972) is an Iranian human rights activist and the vice president of the Defenders of Human Rights Center (DHRC), headed by Nobel Peace Prize laureate Shirin Ebadi. In May 2016, she was sentenced in Tehran to 16 years' imprisonment for establishing and running "a human rights movement that campaigns for the abolition of the death penalty". In 2022, she was named in the BBC 100 Women list.

Background 
Mohammadi was born in Zanjan, Iran. She attended Imam Khomeini International University, receiving a degree in physics, and became a professional engineer. During her university career, she wrote articles supporting women's rights in the student newspaper and was arrested at two meetings of the political student group Tashakkol Daaneshjuyi Roshangaraan ("Enlightened Student Group"). She was also active in a mountain climbing group, but due to her political activities, was later banned from joining climbs.

She went on to work as a journalist for several reformist newspapers, and published a book of political essays titled The reforms, the Strategy and the Tactics. In 2003, she joined the Defenders of Human Rights Center, headed by Nobel Peace Prize laureate Shirin Ebadi; she later became the organization's vice president.

In 1999, she married fellow pro-reform journalist Taghi Rahmani, who not long after was arrested for the first time. Rahmani moved to France in 2012 after serving a total of 14 years of prison sentences, but Mohammadi remained to continue her human rights work. Mohammadi and Rahmani have twin children, Ali and Kiana.

Legal issues 
Mohammadi was first arrested in 1998 for her criticisms of the Iranian government and spent a year in prison. In April 2010, she was summoned to the Islamic Revolutionary Court for her membership in the DHRC. She was briefly released on $50,000 bail but re-arrested several days later and detained at Evin prison. Mohammadi's health declined while in custody, and she developed an epilepsy-like disease causing her to periodically lose muscle control. After a month, she was released and allowed to go to the hospital.

In July 2011, Mohammadi was prosecuted again, and found guilty of "acting against the national security, membership of the DHRC and propaganda against the regime". In September, she was sentenced to 11 years' imprisonment. Mohammadi stated that she had learned of the verdict only through her lawyers and had been "given an unprecedented 23-page judgment issued by the court in which they repeatedly likened my human rights activities to attempts to topple the regime." In March 2012, the sentence was upheld by an appeals court, though it was reduced to six years. On 26 April, she was arrested to begin her sentence.

The sentence was protested by the British Foreign Office, which called it "another sad example of the Iranian authorities' attempts to silence brave human rights defenders." Amnesty International designated her a prisoner of conscience and called for her immediate release. Reporters Without Borders issued an appeal on Mohammadi's behalf on the ninth anniversary of photographer's Zahra Kazemi death in Evin prison, stating that Mohammadi was a prisoner whose life was "in particular danger." In July 2012, an international group of lawmakers called for her release, including US Senator Mark Kirk, former Canadian Attorney General Irwin Cotler, UK MP Denis MacShane, Australian MP Michael Danby, Italian MP Fiamma Nirenstein, and Lithuanian MP Emanuelis Zingeris.

On July 31, 2012, Mohammadi was released from prison.

On 31 October 2014, Mohammadi made a moving speech at the gravesite of Sattar Beheshti, stating, "How is it that the Parliament Members are suggesting a Plan for the Promotion of Virtue and Prevention of Vice, but nobody spoke up two years ago, when an innocent human being by the name of Sattar Beheshti died under torture in the hands of his interrogator?" Despite the act of extreme violence against Beheshti, which was met with an international uproar back in 2012, his case still raises questions and Evin prison still witnesses torture and unfair arrests of human rights defenders until today. The video of Mohammadi's 31 October speech quickly went viral on social media networks resulting in her being summoned to Evin Prison Court. "In the summons I received on 5 November 2014, it is stated that I must turn myself in 'for charges,' but there is no further explanation about these charges," she stated.

On May 5, 2015, Mohammadi was again arrested on the basis of new charges.  Branch 15 of the Revolutionary Court sentenced her to ten years' imprisonment on the charge of “founding an illegal group” for Legam (the step by step to stop the death penalty campaign), five years for “assembly and collusion against national security,” a year for “propaganda against the system” for her interviews with international media and her March 2014 meeting with the EU's then High Representative for Foreign Affairs and Security Policy, Catherine Ashton. In January 2019, Mohammadi was reported to have begun a hunger strike, along with the detained British-Iranian citizen Nazanin Zaghari-Ratcliffe, in Tehran's Evin prison, to protest being denied access to medical care. In July 2020, she was showing symptoms of a COVID-19 infection, from which she appeared to have recovered by August. 
 
On 8 October 2020, Mohammadi was released from prison.

On 27 February 2021, she released a video via social media explaining that she had been summoned to court twice in December, for a case that had been opened against her while she was still in prison. Mohammadi stated that she was refusing to appear in court and would be disobeying any judgements made. In the video, she describes the sexual abuse and ill-treatment she herself and other women were subjected to in prisons and says authorities had still not responded to the complaint she had made in this regard on 24 December. The new case opened against her concerned the sit-in staged by female political prisoners at Evin Prison, in protest to the killing and arrests of protesters by security forces in November 2019.

In March 2021, Mohammadi penned the foreword to the Iran Human Rights Annual Report on the Death Penalty in Iran. She wrote: "The execution of people like Navid Afkari and Ruhollah Zam in the past year, have been the most ambiguous executions in Iran. Issuing the death penalty for Ahmadreza Djalali is one of the most erroneous sentences and the reasons for the issuance of these death sentences need to be carefully examined. These people have been sentenced to death after being held in solitary confinement and subjected to horrific psychological and mental torture, that is why I do not consider the judicial process to be fair or just; I see keeping defendants in solitary confinement, forcing them to make untrue and false confessions that are used as the key evidence in issuing these sentences. That’s why I am particularly worried about the recent arrests in Sistan and Baluchistan and Kurdistan, and I hope that anti-death penalty organisations will pay special attention to the detainees because I fear that we will be facing another wave of executions over the coming year."

In May, Branch 1188 of Criminal Court Two in Tehran sentenced Mohammadi to two-and-a-half years in prison, 80 lashes and two separate fines for charges including “spreading propaganda against the system.” Four months later, she received a summons to begin serving this sentence, but she did not respond since she considered the conviction unjust.

On 16 November 2021, Mohammadi was arbitrary arrested in Karaj, Alborz province, while attending a memorial for Ebrahim Ketabdar, who was killed by Iranian security forces during nationwide protests in November 2019.

In December 2022, during the protests triggered by the death in custody of Mahsa Amini, Narges Mohammadi, in a report which was published by BBC, detailed the sexual and physical abuse of detained women. In January 2023, she gave a shocking report from prison which details the condition of the women in Evin Prison, including a list of 58 prisoners and the interrogation process and tortures they have gone through. 57 of these women have spent 8350 days in the solitary confinement in total. 56 of these women are sentenced to 3300 months in total.

Awards and accolades 
 2023 : Olof Palme Prize from the Swedish Olof Palme Foundation
 2022 Recognition as one of BBC's 100 inspiring and influential women  
 2018 Andrei Sakharov Prize from the American Physical Society
 2016 Human Rights Award of the German city of Weimar
 2011 Per Anger Prize, the Swedish governments international award for human rights
 2010 When Nobel Laureate Shirin Ebadi won the Felix Ermacora Human Rights Award she dedicated it to Mohammadi. "This courageous woman deserves this award more than I do," Ebadi said.
 2009 Alexander Langer Award, named for peace activist Alexander Langer. The award carried a 10,000-euro honorarium.

Works 

 White Torture: inside Iran's prisons for women. OneWorld Publications, 2022. 

1972 births
Living people
People from Zanjan, Iran
Iranian dissidents
Iranian human rights activists
Iranian prisoners and detainees
Amnesty International prisoners of conscience held by Iran
Imam Khomeini International University alumni
People convicted of spreading propaganda against the system by the Islamic Republic of Iran
People convicted of action against national security by the Islamic Republic of Iran
Iranian women activists
Iranian religious-nationalists
Women human rights activists
Members of the National Council for Peace
BBC 100 Women